St Martin's Church is a Grade II* listed parish church in the Church of England in Stoney Middleton, Derbyshire.

History

The church dates from the 15th century and was built by Joan Eyre to celebrate the safe return of her husband from the Battle of Agincourt. Following a serious fire in 1757, the main body of the church was rebuilt in 1759 in an octagonal form by James Paine.

The church was restored in 1861 when the west gallery was removed, and a north vestry was added in 1880.

Parish status
The church is in a joint parish with 
All Saints' Church, Curbar
St Giles' Church, Longstone
The Good Shepherd Church, Wardlow

Organ

The church contains a pipe organ by Cousans Sons and Co dating from 1903. A specification of the organ can be found on the National Pipe Organ Register.

See also
Grade II* listed buildings in Derbyshire Dales
Listed buildings in Stoney Middleton

References

Church of England church buildings in Derbyshire
Grade II* listed churches in Derbyshire
Octagonal churches in the United Kingdom